Hefei Metro Line 4 is a metro line in Hefei, Anhui, China, which opened on 26 December 2021.

Opening timeline

Stations

References

04
2021 establishments in China
Railway lines opened in 2021